"Le Monocle de Mon Oncle" is a poem from Wallace Stevens's first book of poetry, Harmonium. It was first published in 1918.

Quoted at the right is the eighth canto. (The whole poem
can be found elsewhere.) Canto I includes the line "I wish that I might
be a thinking stone."

Harold Bloom regaled his students with an
off-beat interpretation of Canto II's line, "Shall I uncrumple this
much-crumpled thing?", as alluding to an inactive sexual relationship to Elsie ("you", the Other).

Canto IV includes the verse, 
This luscious and impeccable fruit of life
Falls, it appears, of its own weight to earth.
When you were Eve, its acrid juice was sweet,
Untasted, in its heavenly, orchard
air.
Canto XI includes the verse,
 If sex were all, then every trembling hand
Could make us squeak, like dolls, the wished-for words.  
And in canto XII the poem concludes with the verse,
Like a rose rabbi, later, I pursued,
And still pursue, the origin and course
Of love, but until now I never knew
That fluttering things have so distinct a shade.
Holly Stevens quotes a letter of her father in which he writes, "I had
in mind simply a man fairly well along in life, looking back and
talking in a more or less personal way about life." This is widely regarded as reticence about the poem's
commentary on his domestic life, or, as Helen Vendler phrases it, the
poem is "about Stevens' failed marriage",
"about [his] middle age and romantic disillusion". She defends herself against the accusation of biographical
reduction, which elsewhere she directs against Joan Richardson's psychobiography of 
Stevens, as follows.   It has been objected that a criticism
suggesting that poems spring from life is reductive, that is to say
that "Le Monocle de Mon Oncle" is about Stevens' failed marriage is
somehow injurious to the poem. It seems to me normal to begin with the
life-occasion as we deduce it from the poem; it is only an error when
one ends there. To tether Stevens' poems to human feeling is at least
to remove him from the "world of ghosts" where he is so often located,
and to insist that he is a poet of more than epistemological questions
alone. 
Vendler and Richardson disagree about how to understand Stevens' distinction between the "true subject" of a poem and "the poetry of the subject". For Richardson it corresponds to the difference between the infantile kernel of a Stevens poem and the surface of his words' appearance. For Vendler the true subject is an experience and the poetry of the subject is a rendering of it. Richardson is led from her conception of the subject—"the fears and uncertainties of the boy who still crouched inside him"—to diagnose the surface of the poem as reflecting "the American dissociation of sensibility that began with the first Puritans giving the rhetorical lie to the truth of their experience." Vendler thinks this is even worse than simply "ending there" in biography, for it leads away from the poetry of the subject, which in her view requires understanding the special role of syntax that allows Stevens to achieve his poetic effects. ("Stevens's words are almost always deflected from their common denotation, and his syntax serves to delay and to disarticulate....What an image was to Pound, a syllable was to Stevens.")

See also "Two Figures in Dense Violet Night".

Notes

References 

 Buttel, Robert. The Making of Harmonium. 1967: Princeton University Press.
 Richardson, Joan. Wallace Stevens: The Early Years 1879-1923. 1986: William Morrow
 Stevens, Holly. The Letters of Wallace Stevens. 1966: University of California Press.
 Vendler, Helen. "The Hunting of Wallace Stevens". New York Review of Books Volume 33 Number 18 (Nov 20, 1986)
 Vendler, Helen. Words Chosen Out Of Desire. 1984: University of Tennessee Press.

1918 poems
American poems
Poetry by Wallace Stevens